Abydos may refer to:

Abydos, a progressive metal side project of German singer Andy Kuntz
Abydos (Hellespont), an ancient city in Mysia, Asia Minor
Abydos (Stargate), name of a fictional planet in the Stargate science fiction universe
Abydos, Egypt, a city in ancient Egypt
Abydos Station, a pastoral lease and cattle station in Western Australia

See also 
Abidu, a village in Iran
Abidos, Pyrénées-Atlantiques, in southwestern France